The 1955-56 Oberliga season was the eighth season of the Oberliga, the top level of ice hockey in Germany. Eight teams participated in the league, and EV Füssen won the championship.

Regular season

Final

EV Füssen – SC Riessersee 4:2 (1:1, 3:1, 0:0)

References

Oberliga (ice hockey) seasons
West
Ger